

This is a list of the National Register of Historic Places listings in Siskiyou County, California.

This is intended to be a complete list of the properties and districts on the National Register of Historic Places in Siskiyou County, California, United States. Latitude and longitude coordinates are provided for many National Register properties and districts; these locations may be seen together in an online map.

There are 21 properties and districts listed on the National Register in the county, including 1 National Historic Landmark.

Current listings

|}

See also

List of National Historic Landmarks in California
National Register of Historic Places listings in California
California Historical Landmarks in Siskiyou County, California

References

Siskiyou